Swedish Gustaf's Church, part of the Church of Sweden Abroad, is the church of the Swedish congregation in Copenhagen, Denmark. It was built between 1907 to 1911 to the design of Swedish architect Theodor Wåhlin  (1864-1948)  and is named after King Gustaf V of Sweden.

History 
The Swedish Church's activities in Copenhagen began in 1901 when Pastor Nils Widner was sent there to work among Swedish sailors. The work, however, soon embraced the many thousands of other Swedes in and around Copenhagen. Religious services were initially held in the Garrison Church on Sankt Annæ Plads, and in rented premises in Rysenstensgade there were daily gatherings in the various compounds that eventually formed.

The need for a church grew, and in 1903 the Swedish Church Society was formed which saw it as its task to realize the construction of a Swedish church in Copenhagen. Swedes who then lived in Copenhagen decided to donate 10 øre per week to finance the church building and Swedish architect Theodor Wåhlin , resident architect at Lund Cathedral, was charged with its design.

As had been the case with St. Alban's English Church two decades earlier, a site was provided by the Danish state on the bank of the moat surrounding Kastellet, although on the opposite, north-western, corner, on the site of the former Grønlands Bastion.

The foundation stone was laid in 1908 at a ceremony attended by both the Swedish and Danish royal couples, and the new church was consecrated in 1911.  Danish architect Gotfred Tvede (1863-1947)  supervised the construction assisted by Hans Alfred Jørgen Jørgensen (1878-1923).

Architecture 
The church is designed in the Jugendstil style and is built in a hard-burnt brownish brick. The complex includes church halls, community centre, offices, rectory, staff houses, archives and storage rooms.
The exterior wall contain a relief designed by Danish artist Henrik Starcke (1899–1973).

Furnishings 
The current organ has 31 steps and was installed in 1947. The pulpit was created by the sculptor Niels Hansen in Copenhagen. The altar is of black granite and has the christogram IHS, usually interpreted as Iesus, Hominum Salvator – "Jesus, Savior of man".

Gallery

See also 

 House of Unitarians, Copenhagen

References

External links 
 

Lutheran churches in Copenhagen
Churches completed in 1911
20th-century Church of Sweden church buildings
Art Nouveau architecture in Copenhagen
Art Nouveau church buildings in Denmark